Voight Nunatak is a nunatak rising to about 1,500 m, 3 nautical miles (6 km) north-northwest of Tollefson Nunatak in the Yee Nunataks, Palmer Land. Mapped by United States Geological Survey (USGS) from surveys and U.S. Navy aerial photographs 1961–68. Named by Advisory Committee on Antarctic Names (US-ACAN) in 1987 after William M. Voight, USGS cartographer, who worked in the field in support of the Ross Ice Shelf Project, at Byrd and Siple Stations and at Dome Charlie in 1974–75.

Nunataks of Palmer Land